Horror is the second and final studio album by American deathcore band With Blood Comes Cleansing. Released on January 22, 2008, by Victory Records to mixed reviews, it deals with the subject of the end of days or Armageddon.

Track listing

 "Intro" — 0:36
 "Hematidrosis" — 3:10
 "Lash Upon Lash" — 2:33
 "Forsaken" — 2:35
 "Filthy Stains" — 2:47
 "The Suffering" — 2:52
 "Blood and Fire" — 2:47
 "Abaddon's Horde" — 3:04
 "Horror" — 2:19
 "Carnivorous Consumption" — 3:41
 "Damnation" — 2:17
 "Eternal Reign" — 2:27

Personnel 

Dean Atkinson – vocals
Jeremy Sims – guitar
Scott Erickson – guitar
Dennis Frazier – bass
Matt Fidler – drums
Zeuss - Producer

References 

2008 albums
Victory Records albums
With Blood Comes Cleansing albums